Sandro Emanuel Gonçalves dos Reis Pires Semedo (born 3 December 1996) is a Portuguese professional footballer who plays as a winger. Semedo is currently without a club after leaving Zalaegerszegi.

Playing career
After representing lower league sides in his native country, Semedo joined Stoke City in the 2012 summer. After a short spell at Colchester United, he joined Leyton Orient's youth setup in 2013.

On 8 July 2015 Semedo was handed a two-year professional deal by the O's. He made his professional debut on 1 September, coming on as a late substitute for Ollie Palmer in a 2–1 League Trophy defeat at Luton Town.

On 1 October 2015 Semedo was loaned to National League side Welling United until 9 January 2016, but was recalled early. On 12 February 2016, Semedo joined Chelmsford City on a one-month loan deal.

He scored his first goal for Leyton Orient in an EFL Trophy tie against Stevenage on 30 August 2016.

Semedo signed for Italian Serie C club Santarcangelo in January 2018, linking up again with former Orient manager Alberto Cavasin.

On 17 October 2019, Semedo joined Almopos Aridaea in Greece. Semedo then joined Cypriot club Ethnikos Assia FC in January 2020.

References

External links

1996 births
Living people
Portuguese footballers
Association football wingers
National League (English football) players
Moldovan Super Liga players
First Professional Football League (Bulgaria) players
Leyton Orient F.C. players
Welling United F.C. players
Chelmsford City F.C. players
FC Zimbru Chișinău players
FC Dunav Ruse players
Santarcangelo Calcio players
Ethnikos Assia FC players
Portuguese expatriate footballers
Portuguese expatriate sportspeople in England
Portuguese expatriate sportspeople in Moldova
Portuguese expatriate sportspeople in Bulgaria
Portuguese expatriate sportspeople in Greece
Portuguese expatriate sportspeople in Cyprus
Expatriate footballers in England
Expatriate footballers in Moldova
Expatriate footballers in Bulgaria
Expatriate footballers in Greece
Expatriate footballers in Cyprus